Empress Xiaozhao may refer to:

Grand Empress Dowager Shangguan (89BC – 37BC), wife of Emperor Zhao of Han
Empress Xiaozhaoren (1653–1678), wife of the Kangxi Emperor during the Qing dynasty